Man from Podolsk is a 2020 Russian comedy-drama film directed by .

Plot 
The film is based on the eponymous play by Dmitry Danilov and tells about a resident of Podolsk and his adventures as a result of unjustified detention by the Moscow police.

Cast

References

External links 
 
 Man from Podolsk at Kinopoisk 

2020 films
2020 comedy-drama films
2020s Russian-language films
Russian comedy-drama films
2020 directorial debut films